Farah Khan Kunder (born 9 January 1965) is an Indian film director, writer, film producer, actress, dancer and choreographer who works predominantly in Hindi films. Khan has choreographed dance routines for more than a hundred songs in over 80 films, winning six Filmfare Awards for Best Choreography and the National Film Award for Best Choreography. In addition, she has worked on Tamil films and also in international projects, such as Marigold: An Adventure in India, Monsoon Wedding, Bombay Dreams and the Chinese films Perhaps Love and Kung Fu Yoga, earning Tony Award and Golden Horse Award nominations. As a film director, she received Filmfare Award for Best Director nominations for her debut Main Hoon Na (2004) and her second one Om Shanti Om (2007) and then went on to direct Tees Maar Khan (2010) and Happy New Year (2014).

Early life and personal life

Farah Khan was born on 9 January 1965. Her father, Kamran Khan (film producer), is a stuntman-turned-filmmaker. Her mother, Menaka Irani, is the sister of former child actors Honey Irani and Daisy Irani. Farah is thus a first cousin of film personalities Farhan Akhtar and Zoya Akhtar (children of Honey Irani). She has one brother, Sajid Khan, who is a comedian, actor and film director.

Farah Khan married Shirish Kunder, the editor of her film Main Hoon Na, on 9 December 2004. They have since worked together on each other's films, such as Jaan-E-Mann, Om Shanti Om, and Tees Maar Khan. Khan gave birth to triplets — one son and two daughters — in 2008 through in vitro fertilisation.

Career
Khan was studying sociology in St. Xavier's College, Bombay when the music video of Michael Jackson's "Thriller" was released. She was so inspired, that although she hadn't danced before that, it soon became her vocation. She learned to dance basically on her own, and set up a dance group.
When the choreographer Saroj Khan walked out of the film Jo Jeeta Wohi Sikandar, Khan took over. This was followed by many more songs. She met actor Shahrukh Khan on the sets of Kabhi Haan Kabhi Naa and the two have since become good friends and started working together.

Khan's work in Monsoon Wedding, Bombay Dreams and Vanity Fair was nominated for a 2004 Tony Award as Best Choreographer, along with collaborator Anthony van Laast, for Bombay Dreams. She has won the Filmfare Best Choreography Award six times. Khan then went on to direct her first film Main Hoon Na starring Shahrukh Khan which was produced by Red Chillies Entertainment. Khan became the second female director to be nominated for Filmfare Best Director Award. As a director, her second movie Om Shanti Om Starring Shah Rukh Khan and debutant Deepika Padukone became the highest grossing Hindi film of all time at its time of release. Tees Maar Khan was her next directorial release. In 2012, she made her film acting debut in a leading role in Shirin Farhad Ki Toh Nikal Padi, directed by Bela Bhansali Sehgal.

Khan initially announced her plans to direct Happy New Year in 2005, multiple delays and cast changes occurred over a number of years. The project was again reported as being in the works as of 2012. The film was finally released in 2014.

Khan trained Colombian pop star Shakira for a Bollywood version of her song Hips Don't Lie for the MTV Video Music Awards on 31 August 2006.   Khan has also choreographed Kylie Minogue for the song "Chiggy Wiggy" in the 2009 movie Blue.

She hosted the celebrity chat show Tere Mere Beach Mein and was a judge on the reality television series Indian Idol – first and second season, Jo Jeeta Wohi Super Star, Entertainment Ke Liye Kuch Bhi Karega and Dance India Dance Li'l Masters. She also judged dance reality show Just Dance alongside Hrithik Roshan and Vaibhavi Merchant on Star Plus.

Khan and her husband have started a production company called "Three's Company" named in honor of their triplets. In 2012, she choreographed "Ishq Wala Love" and "Radha" for Student Of The Year. In 2013, she choreographed "Jumping Jhapak".

In 2015, Khan replaced Salman Khan and hosted the reality show Bigg Boss Halla Bol, the spin-off of Bigg Boss season 8.

Filmography

Film

Choreography

Television

See also
 Indian Women in Dance

Further reading

References

External links

 
 
 

1965 births
Living people
20th-century Indian dancers
21st-century Indian dancers
21st-century Indian film directors
21st-century Indian women artists
Artists from Mumbai
Best Choreography National Film Award winners
Businesswomen from Maharashtra
Dancers from Maharashtra
Film directors from Mumbai
Film producers from Mumbai
Hindi-language film directors
Indian choreographers
Indian film choreographers
Indian television presenters
Indian women choreographers
Indian women film directors
Indian women film producers
Indian women television presenters
Women artists from Maharashtra
20th-century Indian women